Towles is a surname.

Notable people with the name include:

Amor Towles (born 1964), American novelist
Dorothea Towles (1922–2006), model
Gladys Root (née Towles; 1905–1982), American attorney
J. R. Towles (born 1984), American baseball player
Joseph Towles (1937–1988), American anthropologist and author
Lois Towles (1912–1983), American classical pianist, music educator, and community activist
Nat Towles (1905–1962), American musician, jazz and big band leader
Tom Towles (1950–2015), American actor